Terego is a district in Uganda's Northern Region. The administrative centre of the district is the trading centre of Leju in Aii-Vu Sub-County. Terego District also hosts an estimated 168,000 refugees, mostly from South Sudan, in the Imvepi Refugee Settlement and the western zones of the Rhino Camp Refugee Settlement in the district.

Geography
Terego District is located in West nile region of nothern Uganda and its new  district created  out of Arua district. It borders the districts of Yumbe to the north, Madi-Okollo to the east, Arua to the south, and Maracha to the west.

The district is drained by seasonal tributaries of the Albert Nile such as the Enyau River.

History
Terego District is contiguous with the former Terego County, which was part of Arua District until 2006. That year, Maracha and Terego Counties were separated from Arua District to form Maracha–Terego District. After nearly five years of disagreement on where the headquarters of the new district should be located, Terego County opted to return to Arua District, leaving Maracha County to form Maracha District on its own. In May 2020, Parliament approved the creation of Terego District, which went into effect on 1 July 2020.

Government
Terego District divided into two counties, Terego East and Terego West. Both counties are divided into three sub-counties: Terego East into Omugo, Udupi, and Uriama, and Terego West into Aii-Vu, Katrini, and Bileafe.

Economy
Agriculture is the mainstay of the economy in Terego District. In the 2014 Ugandan census, 98.8% of households in Terego and Terego East Sub-Counties reported being engaged in agriculture. Major crops include beans, corn and sweet potatoes.

References

Terego District
Districts of Uganda
2020 establishments in Uganda
States and territories established in 2020